Aaron Zang (born 21 June 1982; as Shu Nu Zang) is a Chinese poker player currently residing in Macau. He won the £1,050,000 No Limit Hold'em Triton Million for Charity event which has the largest single payout in poker tournament history.

Poker career 
Zang got into poker through a friend after he went to university. He regularly deposited money into the partypoker online poker room which he repeatedly gambled away. In 2006, his uncle gave him ¥1,000 which he used to build a bankroll of ¥400,000. In 2007, Zang began playing professionally in Macau.

In 2019, Zang won the £1,050,000 No Limit Hold'em Triton Million defeating Bryn Kenney heads up. The tournament had the largest scheduled single payout in poker tournament history with first place receiving £19,000,000 ($23,100,000). However, due to a prize splitting deal agreed with Kenney, Zang ended up receiving £13,779,491 ($16,775,820) for 1st while Kenney received the larger prize of £16,890,509 ($20,563,324) for finishing 2nd. The deal was made when the tournament entered heads up with Kenney holding an over 5:1 chip lead against Zang. Zang made a comeback and eventually won the tournament. For his victory in the 2019 Triton Million event, Zang received the third largest single payout in poker tournament history behind Kenney's 2nd place prize in the same tournament and Antonio Esfandiari's victory prize at 2012 Big One for One Drop for $18,346,673.

As of August 2020, Zang has won over US$17,600,000 in live poker tournaments, overtaking Elton Tsang as the most successful Chinese poker player in live tournaments.

Personal life 
Zang played Magic: The Gathering during high school and won a Chinese championship in the card game. He graduated from university in 2005. In 2013, he founded a company specializing in Bitcoin in Shenzhen.

References

External links
 Aaron Zang on Hendon Mob

1982 births
Chinese poker players
Living people